Eobacteria is a proposed clade characterized by Cavalier-Smith. Species in this group lack lipopolysaccharide.

The clade includes Hadobacteria and Chlorobacteria.

References

Bergey's volume 1